Kayea coriacea is a species of flowering plant in the Calophyllaceae family. It is found only in Papua New Guinea.

References

Endemic flora of Papua New Guinea
Vulnerable plants
coriacea
Taxonomy articles created by Polbot